José Amado Ricardo Guerra is the Secretary of Council of Ministers in Cuba. He was appointed as part of the 2009 shake-up by Raúl Castro.

References

Government ministers of Cuba
Living people
Communist Party of Cuba politicians
Year of birth missing (living people)
Place of birth missing (living people)